Magdalena Lobnig (born 19 July 1990 in Sankt Veit an der Glan) is an Austrian rower. She won the double scull World U23 Championship in 2012 and the singles European Championship in 2016. In 2021, at the 2020 Summer Olympics she won the bronze medal in the Women's single sculls event.

References

External links
 
 
 

1990 births
Living people
Austrian female rowers
Olympic rowers of Austria
Olympic medalists in rowing
Olympic bronze medalists for Austria
Rowers at the 2016 Summer Olympics
Rowers at the 2020 Summer Olympics
Medalists at the 2020 Summer Olympics
World Rowing Championships medalists for Austria
European Rowing Championships medalists
People from Sankt Veit an der Glan
Sportspeople from Carinthia (state)